Tregurtha Downs is a hamlet, near Goldsithney in the parish of St Hilary, Cornwall, United Kingdom and is the name of a mine opened in 1883.

The foundation stone for a new engine house was laid on 24 August 1882. The engine was made at Copperhouse, by Sandys, Vivian and Co and previously worked in mines at Crenver and Abraham in the parish of Crowan. It was christened ″St Aubyn″ after one of the directors, William Molesworth-St Aubyn, MP for Helston, when it was first fired on 27 March 1883.

By July 1883, Tregurtha and Owen Vean were producing 5 tons of tin a month and in June 1884 an estimated 80 tons of tinstone could be crushed every 24 hours with the opening of the new stamps. The following year the mine was amalgamated with Owen Vean and on 18 April 1885 the mine closed and was put up for sale; forty to fifty men, unpaid for many weeks, were out of work causing hardship for their families. The 80-inch pumping engine and other machinery was put up for auction on 19 June 1885.

References

External links

 Tregurtha Downs mine

Hamlets in Cornwall
Mines in Cornwall